The 2010 Tri Nations Series was the 15th annual Tri Nations series between the national rugby union teams of New Zealand, Australia and South Africa.

New Zealand clinched the series crown with one match remaining, scoring two tries in the last 3 minutes to defeat South Africa 29–22 on 21 August in the first-ever Test at FNB Stadium in Johannesburg. The 2010 Tri-Nations season has seen new records set by the All Blacks; they are the first team to finish undefeated since the expansion of the tournament to 9 rounds, and have seen the highest number of tries and overall points in the history of the tournament.

The series concluded 11 September 2010 with New Zealand's win over Australia 23–22. The 2011 series commenced on 23 July 2011 in Australia.

Background 
New Zealand, South Africa and Australia were ranked first, second, and third in the IRB World Rankings, but this changed due to Australia's 21–20 loss to England on 16 June 2010. This game moved Australia down to fourth in the IRB World Rankings but they returned to third in rankings a week later, after France's heavy defeat to Argentina and Australia's win against Ireland in the last week of the 2010 mid-year rugby test series.

The final match of the Bledisloe Cup series between Australia and New Zealand took place after the Tri-Nations, on 30 October (the first 3 matches of the series were part of the Tri-Nations).

Standings

Fixtures
All times are local

New Zealand vs South Africa, Auckland 

Touch judges:
Alain Rolland (Ireland)
Stuart Dickinson (Australia)
Television match official:
Ben Skeen (New Zealand)

 Following the match, Bakkies Botha was handed a nine-week suspension for headbutting Jimmy Cowan in the first minute of the match, an offence missed by referee Alan Lewis. The suspension sidelined Botha for the remainder of the Tri Nations.

New Zealand vs South Africa, Wellington 

Touch judges:
Alan Lewis (Ireland)
Stuart Dickinson (Australia)
Television match official:
Glenn Newman (New Zealand)

 During this match the All Blacks became the highest point scorers in international rugby, passing France.
 Following the match, Jean de Villiers was handed a two-week suspension for a lifting tackle against Rene Ranger. De Villiers' previously good disciplinary record was cited as a mitigating factor with regard to the length of suspension. The suspension sidelined de Villiers for the Springboks' next match against Australia.

Australia vs South Africa, Brisbane 

 Following the match, two players, one from each team, were handed suspensions:
 Jaque Fourie was suspended for four weeks for a spear tackle of Richard Brown. He will miss the Springboks' next Test against the All Blacks.
 Quade Cooper was suspended for two weeks for a spear tackle of Morné Steyn. As in the case of Jean de Villiers last week, Cooper's previously good disciplinary history was cited as a mitigating factor. The Australian Rugby Union appealed the length of the ban, presumably because the suspensions of Fourie and de Villiers kept them out of only one Test, but was denied. Cooper was sidelined for the first two Bledisloe Cup Tests in Melbourne and Christchurch.

Australia vs New Zealand, Melbourne 

 Following the match, IRB referee chief Paddy O'Brien announced that Cobus Wessels would be dropped as a touch judge for the upcoming New Zealand–Australia Test because of a number of key errors, most notably Wessels' recommendation that Wallabies wing Drew Mitchell receive the first of his two yellow cards for what O'Brien deemed a marginal penalty. As a result, the IRB made a one-off exception to its standard policy of requiring neutral touch judges and referees for international matches, assigning New Zealander Keith Brown to take Wessels' place.

New Zealand vs Australia, Christchurch

South Africa vs New Zealand, Johannesburg 

 Springboks captain John Smit became the second Springbok to earn 100 Test caps, after Percy Montgomery.
 The result of this match meant that the All Blacks took the 2010 Tri-Nations title with one match remaining, as well as the Freedom Cup.
 This game also marked the All Blacks' 1000th win in international rugby, including non-Test matches.

South Africa vs Australia, Pretoria 

 For the second straight week, a Springbok earned his 100th Test cap, with Victor Matfield reaching this milestone.

South Africa vs Australia, Bloemfontein 

 This was the Wallabies' first win on the Highveld since 1963.
 John Smit earned his 102nd Test cap, equalling the South Africa record of Percy Montgomery.
 Morné Steyn extended his personal streak of successful kicks at goal in Tests to 38. Statistics on success rates of goal kickers were not kept until the late 1980s, but it is very likely that Steyn has set an all-time record. Steyn surpassed the previous (recorded) best of Scotland's Chris Paterson at 36.

Australia vs New Zealand, Sydney 

Source: Tri Nations Web

This test was a milestone for Richie McCaw, who surpassed Sean Fitzpatrick as the most-capped New Zealand captain.
The win is the 10th win in a row for New Zealand over Australia, a new record.
New Zealand are the first team in the Tri Nations series to win undefeated since 2003, and set records for the most points (184) and tries scored (22).

Player statistics

Leading try scorers 

Source: scrum.com

Leading point scorers 

Source: scrum.com

See also
 History of rugby union matches between Australia and South Africa
 History of rugby union matches between Australia and New Zealand
 History of rugby union matches between New Zealand and South Africa

References

External links 
 All Blacks Tri Nations website
 
 Wallabies Tri Nations website

The Rugby Championship
Tri Nations
Tri
Tr1
2010 rugby union tournaments for national teams